Republic road I-5 is a major road in central Bulgaria. It runs between Danube Bridge, at the Danube border with Romania, and the Makaza pass, at the border crossing to Greece. Most of it provides one driving lane per direction. Road I-5 follows European route E85 from Ruse to Haskovo.

Description
Road I-5 begins from Danube Bridge, at the Danube border with Romania. The road bypasses Ruse and runs south. It bypasses Veliko Tarnovo and then turns southwest before reaching Gabrovo. In February 2015, the government announced plans to build Veliko Tarnovo–Ruse motorway, that will supersede I-5.

Currently the road passes through the Balkan Mountains via the Shipka Pass (el. . To improve the traffic conditions, a 3.2 km tunnel is planned to be built. The construction of the Gabrovo bypass, the first stage of the project, already has begun in 2013. The heavyweight freight traffic uses another road through the Pass of the Republic to cross the mountain.

The road leaves the Balkan Mountains at Shipka and then passes through the centre of Kazanlak. It bypasses Stara Zagora before connecting with Trakia motorway (A1) at Stara Zagora interchange.

South of Dimitrovgrad, road I-5 will make connection with Maritsa motorway (A4), which shall provide fast and comfortable access to Turkey, at Kapitan Andreevo border checkpoint.

A new 24 km section of road I-5 between Kardzhali and the village of Podkova opened to traffic in February 2014, providing safer and faster access to Makaza border crossing to Greece.

References

External links
Road network of Bulgaria at RIA
Detailed road maps of Bulgaria Bulgarian Visitor Information website

Roads in Bulgaria
European route E85